Fritz Johann Hansgirg (18911949) was an Austrian electrochemist and metallurgist who in 1928 invented the carbothermic magnesium reduction process, similar to the Pidgeon process. In 1934, he left Austria for the Empire of Japan where he worked with industrialist Shitagau Noguchi to set up a magnesium plant and further helped the Japanese build a pilot plant to produce heavy water by the Combined Electrolysis Catalytic Exchange (CECE) he invented. Coming to the United States in 1940, he worked with American industrialist Henry J. Kaiser to design a magnesium plant in California, but at the outbreak of World War II, Hansgirg was arrested by the FBI on a Presidential warrant and interned for "the duration of the war". After the war, the Soviet Union captured Hansgirg's plants in northern Korea, using the plants' processes and equipment for their atomic bomb project against the United States, likewise, using them in the Manhattan Project, the exact details of which still remain classified in both the United States and Russia.

Early life 

Fritz Hansgirg was born in Graz, Austria in 1891 and received his Doctor of Philosophy (PhD) in chemistry from the University of Graz. He was married to Josephine Marie (née Heller). Her son from her first marriage, Peter Robert Hofstätter, graduated from the University of Vienna, served as a military psychologist in the Nazi Germany army during World War II.

Austria 

In 1928, Hansgirg invented, and patented, the carbothermic magnesium reduction process while working in his Radenthein laboratory that was a less costly method of mass-producing magnesium of extremely high purity.  After setting up a pilot plant in Radenthein to produce magnesium using his process, his senior partner, Emil Winter of The Pittsburgh Steel Company, urged him to sell the patent rights to the highest bidder, which he did in 1934 then leaving Austria for the Empire of Japan. The pilot plant never worked at full strengthit took a lot of accessories, in addition working with magnesium requires sophisticated equipment and increased caution due to pyrophoricity magnesium dust and explosive gas mixtures.

Empire of Japan 

In 1934, Hansgirg arrived in the Empire of Japan joining with Japanese industrialist Shitagau Noguchi to set up a magnesium plant at the Chosen Nitrogen Fertilizer Complex in what is known now as the northern Korea city of Hungnam. (Because of the Japan–Korea Treaty of 1910, there was no country known at this time as Korea (either north or south) as it had been formally annexed into the empire.)
Noguchi (company "Nichitsu) and Winter (American Magnesium Metals Corporation) established the subsidiary Japanese magnesium company. Hansgirg took the post of vice-president of both American and Japanese magnesium companies.  There were problems with financing. Magnesium production in the Empire of Japan was initiated only during World War II.

But Hansgirg (Hansgierg) was not limited to magnesium. On his initiative in 1936 was founded a new firm Nitehiuu Gemstones, he himself owned 15 percent shares of this company. It was due to the fact that the increased demand for Jewel bearing for military purposes.

Hansgirg further aided the Empire by developing a cracking plant (used to break down crude oil into its various component parts). Before leaving Austria, he designed two applications for a method of producing heavy water using a water gas shift reaction. It is believed that he could help the Japanese in the production of heavy water in Konan, which was suspected by the United States of aiding the Japanese nuclear weapon program.

United States 

In May 1940, Hansgirg left the Empire of Japan after its pro Axis mood became "hostile to foreigners" arriving in the United States where he joined with the American industrialist Henry J. Kaiser. Before the war a demand aircraft engineering increased in the light magnesium alloys.

However, starting Permanete plant in August 1941 was not pat and accompanied by explosions with human victims. As it turned out, in practice, the technology Hansgirg process remained the same imperfect as it was in Radenthein. In this process, there was a need to work with magnesium dust, which ignites in the air with an explosion. PMC engineers built a pilot plant urgently to improve the process. However, the yield of the heavy situation was found not to changes technology, but enlargement the use of dust. The PMC invented a new incendiary mixture of "goop" – paste of magnesium dust and gelled gasoline with additives. Special bomb was developed. Government price controls allowed the leadership of PMC stand the competition "goop" with napalm and avoid large financial losses. For September 1943 PMC leadership was ready to leave only 10% of the dust to produce magnesium in the form of ingots. For the entire war period PMC has issued 20 million lbs. of magnesium and 86 million lbs. of "goop". The proportion of bombs M74 and M76 with "goop". constituted about 8% of the total tonnage of incendiaries that were used in the bombing in Japan and Germany. After the war Permanente plan was stopped, and the end of 1945 ahead of schedule Kaiser paid on credits taken.
Nine days after the December 7, 1941, attack on Pearl Harbor plunged the United States into World War II, Hansgirg was arrested by the FBI on a presidential warrant accused of being "potentially dangerous to the public peace and safety of the United States", with fears that the Kaiser magnesium plant would be shut down because of his arrest proving to be unwarranted.

After being arrested, Hansgirg was first held at the jail in Santa Clara County, California, and during the war was held at U.S. alien internment camps in San Antonio, Texas and Stringtown, Oklahoma.

During Hansgirg's wartime internment, U.S. Attorney General Francis Biddle denied permission for his wife, Josephine Marie, to visit him, with her then appealing in a woman-to-woman hand-written letter to First Lady Eleanor Roosevelt seeking leniency and explaining that her husband could not criticize Adolf Hitler because their son was still in the German army and would be retaliated against if he did so. Josephine ended this letter by stating:

Black Mountain College 

Marie Hansgirg's letter on behalf of her husband was forwarded by First Lady Eleanor Roosevelt to Federal Bureau of Investigation (FBI) Director J. Edgar Hoover, who in turn consulted with the Director of the Alien Enemy Control Unit resulting in Hansgirg being released under the parole of Theodore Dreier, the treasurer of Black Mountain College, a progressive experimental educational community in North Carolina. Hansgirg was appointed as chemistry professor to replaced Charles Lindsley, who took a position with the US Department of Defense doing research for the War Department in 1942. The decision was taken on the advice of the famous Austrian scientist Karl Terzaghi. Hansgirg's parolee sponsorship was transferred in 1943 to Dr. W. R. Wunsch, another employee at Black Mountain College, and then to Isaac Van Horn in July 1944.

At Black Mountain College, Hansgirg combined the teaching of chemistry and physics with research and business activities. In 1943, an extension was added to the school's science building to make room for a photography darkroom and Hansgirg's experiments in extracting magnesium from olivine, a locally abundant mineral. Later in the same year, he developed a modified method of magnesium production involving the use of calcium carbide as a reducing agent. Hansgirg created and applied for patents under the name of the North Carolina Magnesium Development Corporation. He gave 20% of the shares of this business to the college.

Although many of his colleagues had fled Europe during the rise of fascism, Hansgirg was the only member of the Black Mountain College community with "enemy alien" status. He was known for letting the college community use his grand piano, his organ, his photographic equipment and his extensive record collection of operas. He was also one of the few faculty with personal wealth, and he provided champagne and strawberries for special celebrations.

In September 1948, the building that housed Hansgirg's equipment and experiments burned down in a fire rumored to have been the result of a fellow faculty member's vodka still.

Death 
After Black Mountain College, Hansgirg moved to New York. There he worked as chief engineer for the  Electro-Metal Corporation and the Bach Corporation, and provided consulting services to the Standard Oil Company of New Jersey.

On July 23, 1949, Hansgirg died unexpectedly at the age of 58. The cause of death is unknown, but suspected to be due his decades ingestion of magnesium, resulting in Hypermagnesemia.

Postwar use of Hansgirg technology 

Immediately after the war, the Soviet Union invaded and occupied northern Korea taking possession of Hansgirg's magnesium and heavy water plants located in the city of Hungnam then transferring the technology back to Russia for integration into their own atomic bomb program. The U.S. Manhattan Project also utilized Hansgirg's CECE process for heavy water production during the war and many years thereafter too. Many aspects of the postwar history related to both the U.S. and Soviet (now Russian) use of Hansgirg's processes still remain classified.

See also

References

Bibliography 
 F. Hansgirg, "Thermal Reduction of Magnesium Compounds", Pt. 1, The Iron Age, Vol. 152, No. 21, pp.52–63, November 18, 1943.
Fritz Hansgirg, "Korea's Industrial Development", originally appeared in Korea Economic Digest (April 1945). 
 Production of magnesium during carbothermal reduction of magnesium oxide by differential condensation of magnesium and alkali vapors
 
 

1891 births
1949 deaths
Austrian chemists
Austrian people of World War II
Henry J. Kaiser
Manhattan Project people
Nuclear chemists
Black Mountain College faculty
Austrian expatriates in Japan
Austrian emigrants to the United States